Aenictus asantei is a species of brown army ant found in Nigeria and Ghana. The species has been observed column raiding Pheidole juveniles. It is named for the Asante people.

References

Dorylinae
Hymenoptera of Africa
Insects described in 1983